Covington is a surname. Notable people with the surname include:
Ann K. Covington, former chief justice of the Supreme Court of Missouri
Arthur Covington (1913–2001), a Canadian physicist
Bucky Covington (born 1977), singer and 8th-place finisher on the 5th season of American Idol
Charles Covington, American jazz pianist
Chet Covington (1910–1976), Major League Baseball pitcher
Chris Covington (born 1996), American football player
Christian Covington (born 1993), American football player
Colby Covington (born 1988), American mixed martial artist
Damien Covington (1972–2002), professional American football player
Dennis Covington (born 1948), American writer
Donald Covington (1928–2002), former Professor of Design in the Art Department of San Diego State University
Fred Covington (1912–1995), English cricketer
George Washington Covington (1838–1911), American politician
Grover Covington (born 1956), Canadian Football League player
Harold Covington (born 1953), American neo-nazi and novelist
Hayden C. Covington (1911–1978), legal counsel for the Watch Tower Bible and Tract Society
Howard Covington British investment banker who was a founding shareholder and director of New Star Asset Management.
James Harry Covington (1870–1942), American jurist and politician
Jerry Covington, American maker of custom motorcycles
Jesse Whitfield Covington (1889–1966), United States Navy sailor who received the Medal of Honor during World War I
Joey Covington (1945–2013), American drummer, best known for his involvements with Hot Tuna and Jefferson Airplane
Julie Covington (born 1947), English singer and actress
Kirk Covington, American drummer best known for his work with the jazz fusion group Tribal Tech
Leonard Covington (1768–1813), US congressman and US general in War of 1812; namesake of various US cities
Lucy Covington (1910–1982), activist for Native American emancipation
Martell Covington, American politician
Matt Covington (born 1980), American speleologist
Robert Covington (born 1990), NBA forward
Scott Covington (born 1976), former college and professional American football quarterback
Syms Covington (c. 1816–1861), assistant to Charles Darwin
Trisha Covington, African-American R&B singer
Tony Covington (born 1967), former American football player
Virginia M. Hernandez Covington (born 1955), American lawyer and federal judge
Warren Covington (1921–1999), American jazz trombonist
Wes Covington (1932-2011), Major League Baseball outfielder
Wickliffe Covington (1867–1938), American painter
William Jacob Covington (1838–1910), first district court clerk of the Camp County, Texas